Emil Vladimirov (born 25 January 1952) is a Bulgarian athlete. He competed in the men's discus throw at the 1980 Summer Olympics.

References

1952 births
Living people
Athletes (track and field) at the 1980 Summer Olympics
Bulgarian male discus throwers
Olympic athletes of Bulgaria
Place of birth missing (living people)